El amor lo manejo yo (English: I will drive this love) is a 2014 Chilean telenovela produced and broadcast by TVN. Based on the Argentine telenovela Dulce amor.

Cast 
 Jorge Zabaleta as Marcos Guerrero
 María Elena Swett as Victoria Duque/Victoria Fernández
 Diego Muñoz as Julián Jiménez
 María Gracia Omegna as Natalia Duque
 Julio Jung Duvauchelle as Alonso García
 Luz Valdivieso as  Laura Green
 Coca Guazzini as Elena Farias
 Patricio Achurra as José "Pepe" Fernández
 Loreto Valenzuela as Isabel Fuentes
 Carmen Gloria Bresky as Gabriela "Gaby" Ahumada
 Ignacio Achurra as Alcides "Máquina" Castro
 Antonia Santa María as Noelia Fernández
 Rodrigo Muñoz as Emilio Montes
 María Elena Duvauchelle as Rosa Prado
 Ariel Mateluna as Lucas Ramírez
 Margarita Hardessen as Valentina Duque
 Soledad Cruz as Rocío Guerrero
 Borja Velasco as Mariano "Nano" Jiménez
 Otilio Castro as Antonio Medina
 Osvaldo Silva as Sergio Montalbán
 Marcelo Valdivieso as Agustín Rensi

Special cast 
 Jorge Yañez as Hugo Bonifatti.
 Pedro Rivadeneira as Corredor de Autos.
 Patricio Andrade as Fermín.
 Sara Becker as Sara "Sarita" Medina.
 Ángela Prieto as Andrea Green.
 Gonzalo Robles as Waldo Guerrero.
 Juan Pablo Sáez as Nicky.
 Mónica Illanes as Cecilia.
 José Palma as Jimmy, novio de Natalia.
 Nicolás Pérez as Matías Schmidt.
 Fernando Olivares as Raúl.
 Max Meriño as Comisario.
 Andrés Arriola as Álvarez.

References

External links 
  

2014 telenovelas
2014 Chilean television series debuts
Chilean telenovelas
Spanish-language telenovelas
Televisión Nacional de Chile telenovelas